A declaration of war by Canada against Germany was made by order-in-council signed by George VI, king of Canada, on 10 September 1939, seven days after the United Kingdom and France had also entered a state of war with the Nazi regime. The royal proclamation of the Canadian declaration was published in the Canada Gazette.

Canadian Prime Minister William Lyon Mackenzie King announced the recommendation for a declaration of war in a radio-broadcast speech, made from Ottawa, on 3 September 1939. The matter was then debated in Parliament, though declaration of war is a matter of the royal prerogative and does not require parliamentary approval.

Background and procedure
Canada did not declare war on Germany at the outset of the First World War, as it had no authority to do so at the time. Though the Canadian Parliament did debate the matter and an order-in-council was issued proclaiming Canada was at war, the country, being part of the British Empire, entered the war with the United Kingdom in consequence of the latter's declaration of war 4 August 1914.

In the aftermath of the First World War, Adolf Hitler rose to power as the Führer of Nazi Germany. The Prime Minister of Canada, William Lyon Mackenzie King, visited Hitler on 29 June 1937, during which both indicated a desire to avoid war; though, Mackenzie King noted Canada and other nations were concerned by Germany's rapid armament, which Hitler blamed on the Treaty of Versailles, a pact he had violated by sending troops into the Rhineland on 7 March 1936. The prime minister told Hitler that, if a war broke out between Germany and Britain, Canada would be at Britain's side. Mackenzie King also met President of the Reichstag Hermann Göring, who, more ominously, asked Mackenzie King if Canada would support Britain if the latter initiated a conflict over a then-hypothetical unification of Germany and Austria. In response, Mackenzie King said it would depend on the circumstances. What the prime minister had told his British counterpart, Neville Chamberlain, when in London in May 1937 was more certain: Canada would be with Britain should an international conflict erupt.

Though Mackenzie King still hoped for peace, Nazi Germany's continued armament and violation of treaties forced the prime minister to accept that Canada might once again have to fight alongside Britain if war broke out. Canadians, and the government, were thus relieved when the Munich Agreement was signed on 30 September 1938, giving Czechoslovakia’s Sudetenland to Germany.

This pact seemed to have appeased Hitler and avoided war. But, by the beginning of the following year, the uneasiness that persisted after the Munich Agreement was once again increasing and Mackenzie King began psychologically preparing parliament for Canada going to war. In his speech on 16 January 1939, he quoted Wilfrid Laurier from 1910: "if Britain is at war, we are at war, and liable to attack"; words that triggered a negative reaction, most strongly felt within Cabinet. Minister of Justice Ernest Lapointe threatened to resign and asserted the prime minister's statement went against the Statute of Westminster, 1931, which, in combination with the Balfour Declaration of 1926, had "established that the United Kingdom and the Dominions were now autonomous in domestic or external affairs"; Canada in 1939 had "the option of making its own decision."

After Germany disregarded the Munich Agreement and invaded the Czech areas of Bohemia and Moravia on 15 March 1939, Mackenzie King vacillated: he told the House of Commons  on 20 March that Canada would go to Britain's aid if bombs fell on London. Ten days later, he said the idea of Canada going to war, only 20 years after the last, was "sheer madness", though also saying the government would reject neutrality. He told the British government in April that he could not predict Canada's course of action, should Britain go to war and be attacked. Lapointe stated Canada's participation in any conflict would be in its own self-interest. His approach was viewed favourably by the Canadian media and public.

Germany invaded Poland on 1 September 1939 and the United Kingdom and France declared war on 3 September. At first, Mackenzie King and Lapointe asserted in the Commons that Canada was bound by the British declaration, regardless of the absence of any explicit Canadian approval for, or given to, the edict issued by George VI on 3 September; they believed Canada was at war, though just how much the country contributed to that war was up to the Canadian government. However, after it was noted that Canada was not on the list of belligerent states in the declaration of neutrality promulgated by President of the United States Franklin D. Roosevelt on 5 September, the Canadian Parliament, which was not scheduled to return until 2 October, was recalled by the governor general early, on 7 September, to consider a declaration of war. Canada's political leaders used this moment to assert Canada's independence from the UK, as already established by the Statute of Westminster.

The throne speech, read by Governor General the Lord Tweedsmuir, set out the Cabinet's proposal for taking the country to war and associated measures, after which the address in reply was debated. The Senate passed the motion to adopt the address in reply on 9 September, while the House of Commons continued to discuss the matter until also adopting the motion late that evening.

The following day, the Cabinet issued an order-in-council stating that Canada was at war with Germany. Vincent Massey, Canada's high commissioner to the United Kingdom, brought the document to King George VI, at the Royal Lodge, Windsor Great Park, for his signature, whereupon Canada had officially declared war on Germany. In his capacity as the government's official recorder for the war effort, Leonard Brockington noted: " did not ask us to declare war for him—we asked King George VI of Canada to declare war for us." The time difference between Britain's and Canada's entry into the conflict was partly intended to demonstrate Canada's sovereignty.

As 10 September was a Sunday, the order-in-council was tabled in the House only on the following day, when the prime minister told that chamber that the Cabinet had issued the order shortly after the motion had been adopted and that the government had been informed, at 11:15 a.m., on 10 September, that the King had granted his approval of the proclamation.

These were significant developments, as they became examples for other Dominions to follow and, by the war's end, F.R. Scott concluded, "it is firmly established as a basic constitutional principle that, so far as relates to Canada, the King is regulated by Canadian law and must act only on the advice and responsibility of Canadian ministers."

The state of war was ended by another royal proclamation issued in 1951.

Documents

Prime Minister King's speech 
Below is the speech, given by William Lyon Mackenzie King:

Royal proclamation

The following proclamation was published in the Canada Gazette, Canada's official publication of record, the morning following Canada's declaration of war on Nazi Germany.

See also 

 Declaration of war by Canada
 Declarations of war during World War II
Diplomatic history of World War II
United Kingdom declaration of war on Germany (1939)
United States declaration of war upon Germany (1941)
War Measures Act

Notes

References

Canada in World War II
Declarations of war during World War II
1939 in Canada
September 1939 events
1939 documents
Canada–Germany relations